Walvisteuthis, the stubby hook squids, is a genus of squid in the family Onychoteuthidae. The genus contains four species. They are characterised by possessing oval fins which are not drawn-out posteriorly, the gladius has elongated-rhomboid vanes and a short, blunt rostrum which is perpendicular to tip of gladius, the gladius is visible beneath skin at the dorsal midline and they only have primary occipital folds.

Species
The four species currently recognised are:

Walvisteuthis jeremiahi Vecchione, Sosnowski & Young, 2015
Walvisteuthis rancureli (Okutani, 1981)
Walvisteuthis virilis Nesis & Nikitina, 1986
Walvisteuthis youngorum (Bolstad, 2010)

References

Squid
Cephalopod genera